was a  after Kenkyū and before Kennin. This period spanned the years from April 1199 through February 1201.

Change of era
 1199 : The new era name was created to mark an event or a number of events. The previous era ended and a new one commenced in Kenkyū 10, on the 27th day of the 4th month of 1199.

Events of the Shōji era
 January 29, 1199 (Shōji 2, 12th day of the 2nd month): Oyama Tomomasa was appointed to the shugo post of Harima Province and governor of Heian-kyō.
 1200 (Shōji 2, 10th month): Hōjō Tokimasa was created daimyō of Ōmi Province.
 1201 (Shōji 3, New Year's Day): Beginning of the Kennin Rebellion.

Notes

References
 Brown, Delmer and Ichiro Ishida. (1979). The Future and the Past: a translation and study of the 'Gukanshō', an interpretative history of Japan written in 1219. Berkeley: University of California Press. ;  OCLC 5145872
 Kitagawa, Hiroshi and Bruce T. Tsuchida, eds. (1975). The Tale of the Heike. Tokyo: University of Tokyo Press. 	; ; ; ;  OCLC 193064639
 Mass, Jeffrey. (1976) The Kamakura Bakufu: A Study in Documents. Stanford: Stanford University Press. ;  OCLC 246494466
 Nussbaum, Louis-Frédéric and Käthe Roth. (2005).  Japan encyclopedia. Cambridge: Harvard University Press. ;  OCLC 58053128
 Titsingh, Isaac. (1834). Nihon Ōdai Ichiran; ou,  Annales des empereurs du Japon.  Paris: Royal Asiatic Society, Oriental Translation Fund of Great Britain and Ireland. OCLC 5850691
 Varley, H. Paul. (1980). A Chronicle of Gods and Sovereigns: Jinnō Shōtōki of Kitabatake Chikafusa. New York: Columbia University Press. ;  OCLC 6042764

External links
 National Diet Library, "The Japanese Calendar" – historical overview plus illustrative images from library's collection

Japanese eras
1190s in Japan
1200s in Japan